Christine Lakeland (born July 11, 1954) is an American musician/songwriter.  She was married to the late guitarist/songwriter J.J. Cale. She played on many of his albums and was a member of his band. She also has recorded several albums under her own name.

Discography

Studio albums 
 1984 Veranda (Comet Records)
 1989 Fireworks (Loft Records)
 1992 Reckoning (LadyFingers Records)
 1998 Turn To Me (LadyFingers Records)

Live album 
 2005 Live At Greenwood Ridge (LadyFingers Records)

Other appearances 
 1996 More Disaster City Blues: A Collection of Contemporary Blues Songs from Los Angeles / California Vol. 2 (Taxim Records)
 2014 Eric Clapton & Friends - The Breeze: An Appreciation of JJ Cale (Bushbranch/Surfdog)

References 

American blues guitarists
American blues singers
American women singer-songwriters
American blues singer-songwriters
Blues rock musicians
Contemporary blues musicians
Living people
1954 births
20th-century American guitarists
20th-century American women guitarists
21st-century American women